A Tourist's Guide to Love is an upcoming romantic comedy film directed by Steven K. Tsuchida and written by Eirene Donohue. It stars Rachael Leigh Cook, Scott Ly, Missi Pyle, Ben Feldman, Nondumiso Tembe and Andrew Barth Feldman.

Filming was done on location in Vietnam in April 2022, and is scheduled to be released on April 27, 2023, on Netflix.

Premise
Following an unforeseen end to a romantic relationship, Amanda (Cook), a travel industry professional agrees to undertake a covert mission to gain insight into Vietnam's tourism sector. She arrives just in time for the Vietnamese Lunar New Year celebration Tết, and soon embarks on a voyage of self-discovery and falls in love with her Vietnamese expatriate tour guide, Sinh (Ly). They decide to hijack the tour bus to experience life and love in unconventional ways.

Cast
 Rachael Leigh Cook as Amanda
 Scott Ly as Sinh
 Missi Pyle
 Ben Feldman
 Nondumiso Tembe 
 Andrew Barth Feldman
 Nondumiso Tembe
 Glynn Sweet
 Alexa Povah
 Jacqueline Correa
 Morgan Lynee Dudley
 Nsưt Lê Thiện
 Quinn Trúc Trần

Production
In April 2021, Variety reported that Rachael Leigh Cook would star in and produce a romantic comedy, A Tourist's Guide to Love, that is based on an original idea of hers with Eirene Donohue writing the screenplay.<ref name="Variety1">{{Cite web |last=Otterson |first=Joe |date=2021-04-01 |title=Rachael Leigh Cook to Star in Netflix Movie A Tourist's Guide to Love', Eirene Donohue to Write (Exclusive) |url=https://variety.com/2021/film/news/rachael-leigh-cook-netflix-movie-a-tourists-guide-to-love-1234942501/ |access-date=2023-02-18 |website=Variety |archive-date=February 18, 2023 |archive-url=https://web.archive.org/web/20230218180048/https://variety.com/2021/film/news/rachael-leigh-cook-netflix-movie-a-tourists-guide-to-love-1234942501/ |url-status=live }}</ref>  The film is a Netflix Original film produced by Head First Productions and Muse Entertainment. In May 2022, the casting of Scott Ly, Ben Feldman, Missi Pyle, Jacqueline Correa, Nondumiso Tembe, Morgan Lynee Dudley, Andrew Barth Feldman, Glynn Sweet, Alexa Povah, Thanh Truc and Le Thien was announced. 

Principal photography commenced in April 2022, and took place on location in various cities of Vietnam, such as Ho Chi Minh City, Da Nang, Hội An, Hanoi and Hà Giang. Donohue explained why it was important to her not to have an American film set in the country that focused on war, saying "There are almost no American movies set in Vietnam that aren't about the trauma of war. It was really important to me to tell a story about life now. One that was full of joy and love and celebration. I wanted to change the conversation about Vietnam, to highlight it as a modern thriving country whose stories are worthy of being told".

ReleaseA Tourist's Guide to Love'' is scheduled to be released on April 27, 2023, on Netflix.

References

External links
 
 
 
 

2023 independent films
2023 romantic comedy films 
2020s English-language films
2020s American films
American independent films
American romantic comedy films
Films directed by Steven Tsuchida
English-language Netflix original films
Films set in Da Nang
Films set in Hanoi
Films set in Ho Chi Minh City
Films shot in Vietnam
Upcoming Netflix original films